Donald J. Manoukian (June 9, 1934 – September 23, 2014) was an American football guard and professional wrestler of Armenian descent from Reno, Nevada.

American football career
An alumnus of Reno High School and Stanford University (class of 1957), Manoukian played professional football for the Salinas Packers of the Pacific Football Conference in 1958 and with the Oakland Raiders as a member of the American Football League team's inaugural 1960 season.

Professional wrestling career
Determining that professional wrestling would be more lucrative (and in part because of his diminutive stature - estimates of his height ranged from between 5 feet 5 inches to 5 feet 9 inches), he switched to wrestling and spent nine years touring the United States and Japan, primarily as a heel.

Occasionally wrestling under the ring name Don the Bruiser, he won several championships as both a singles wrestler and a tag team wrestler. He won several titles in Pacific Northwest Wrestling, including the Heavyweight Championship in 1964. Previously he won the NWA Pacific Northwest Tag Team Championship twice, once with Kurt von Poppenheim in 1959 and two years later with Shag Thomas. He also regularly teamed with Dick Beyer, with whom he won both the WWA International Television Tag Team Championship and the Los Angeles version of the NWA International Television Tag Team Championship.

Personal life
By 1967, Manoukian had retired into a life of real estate and business investment. His outgoing and humorous personality made him popular as a master of ceremonies at events throughout the Reno area in his later life. He died September 23, 2014 at the age of 80 following a brief illness. He had at least two wives and three children.

Championships and accomplishments
Cauliflower Alley Club
Men's honoree (1997)
Pacific Northwest Wrestling
NWA Pacific Northwest Heavyweight Championship (1 time)
NWA Pacific Northwest Tag Team Championship (2 times) - with Kurt von Poppenheim (1) and Shag Thomas (1)
Worldwide Wrestling Associates
WWA International Television Tag Team Championship (1 time) - with Dick Beyer
Southwest Sports, Inc.
NWA Texas Heavyweight Championship (1 time)

References
Ray Hagar and Guy Clifton (September 24, 2014). Reno's Don Manoukian, ex-Oakland Raider, dies at 80. Reno Gazette Journal. Retrieved September 24, 2014.
Associated Press (September 24, 2014). Ex-Raider, wrestler Manoukian dies in Reno at 80. Retrieved September 24, 2014.
Oliver, Greg (September 7, 2006). Manoukian shunned football for 'rasslin. Slam! Sports. Retrieved September 24, 2014.

External links
Manoukian's NFL.com profile

1934 births
2014 deaths
American football offensive guards
American male professional wrestlers
Oakland Raiders players
Stanford Cardinal football players
People from Merced, California
Sportspeople from Reno, Nevada
Players of American football from Nevada
American people of Armenian descent
Reno High School alumni
American Football League players